Rob O'Donnell (born 15 December 1985) is an English rugby union player from Liverpool currently playing for Yorkshire Carnegie in the RFU Championship.

O’Donnell joined Yorkshire Carnegie from Worcester Warriors on a two-year contract and became Head Coach Bryan Redpath's ninth signing for the new RFU Championship season.

He had previously joined Worcester Warriors from Rotherham Titans in 2012 and the Liverpool-born prop has also had playing spells at Sale Sharks and Waterloo. He stands at 6 ft 5in and weighs over 19 stone and can operate on both sides of the scrum. Rob also had a brief rugby coaching career at Rydal Penrhos in North Wales.

External links

Stat Bunker profile
Rotherham profile

1985 births
Living people
English rugby union players
Lancashire County RFU players
Rotherham Titans players
Rugby union players from Liverpool
Sale Sharks players
Worcester Warriors players
Rugby union locks
Rugby union props